Reiner Kruecken is the Nuclear Science Division Director at Lawrence Berkeley National Laboratory. Before moving to LBNL in June 2022, he served as Deputy Director at TRIUMF, Canada's Particle Accelerator Centre. He joined TRIUMF in February 2011 after  years at the Technical University Munich, Germany, where he held the chair (C4) for Experimental Physics of Hadrons and Nuclei. From 2011 to 2015 Kruecken was the head of the Science Division at TRIUMF and he held a joint appointment as full professor in the Department of Physics and Astronomy at the University of British Columbia in Vancouver, Canada.  Kruecken received his Ph.D. in nuclear physics from the University of Cologne in 1995. After a postdoctoral fellowship at Lawrence Berkeley National Laboratory he moved to Yale University in 1997, where he was an assistant professor at the Physics Department and the A.W. Wright Nuclear Structure Laboratory until he moved to Munich in 2002. His current research interests are in the area of the structure of exotic nuclei, nuclear astrophysics, as well as applications of nuclear physics methods to radiation biology and medicine. He is an adjunct professor at the University of British Columbia in Vancouver, Canada

He serves as member on numerous international review, funding and advisory committees, including IUPAP C12, GANIL Scientific Council, JINA IAC. From 2007 until 2010 he served as the chair of the ‘Hadrons and Nuclei’ chapter of the Deutsche Physikalische Gesellschaft (DPG), and was its deputy chair in 2010 and 2011. From 2003 to 2009 Kruecken was a member of the German Advisory Committee for Hadrons and Nuclei (KHuK) and was its deputy chair from 2003 to 2006. From 2006 to 2010 he was a research area coordinator and research board member of the DFG Cluster of Excellence "Origin and Structure of the Universe" in Munich. He served as the science representative of the German delegation of the Nuclear Physics Working Group, OECD Global Science Forum from 2006 to 2008. He was a member of the editorial boards of Progress in Nuclear and Particle Physics as well as European Physical Journal A. From 2006 to 2011 he was a member of the selection committee for the German Cecil Rhodes Scholarships of The Rhodes Trust, for which he served as chairmen from 2010 to 2011.

References 

Living people
American physicists
Academic staff of the University of British Columbia
Year of birth missing (living people)
Fellows of the American Physical Society